Solidago patula, the roundleaf goldenrod or rough-leaved goldenrod, is a species of goldenrod found in wetlands, especially swamps, fens, and sedge meadows. It is native to most of the eastern United States, as far west as Wisconsin and Texas. It is a perennial herb. There are two subspecies.

References

patula
Flora of the Eastern United States
Taxa named by Carl Ludwig Willdenow